The Second Hand Stopped is the debut studio album by American metalcore band Odd Project, released on July 13, 2004.

Track listing
  Statistics Like Cigarettes – 3:41
  The Phone Is Such A Blunt Object – 3:32
  A Hero's Trial – 4:23
  A Perfect Smile and Broken Wings – 3:33
  Tear Stained Lies – 3:40
  Love – 3:19
  The Fashion Police Hate Robots – 3:31
  Photographic Memories – 4:57
  The Wanderer – 2:02
  Silver Screen Lovers – 4:37

Personnel
 Matt Lamb – lead vocals
 Scott Zschomler – lead guitar, vocals
 Eric Cline – bass guitar, backing vocals
 Greg Pawloski – rhythm guitar
 Christian Escobar – drums

2004 debut albums
Indianola Records albums